The 1915 American Grand Prize was the first race of the 1915 Grand Prix season and was held February 27, 1915, at the Panama–Pacific International Exposition, sometimes mistakenly referred to as the San Francisco World's Fair. Unlike the previous American Grand Prize races that saw few entrants, 39 cars entered the 1915 race, 35 appeared, and 30 took the start. Rain began mid-race and 11 cars pulled off course and withdrew. Dario Resta won the race by over six minutes over Howdy Wilcox. His average speed was 56.13 mph (90.33 km/h), slowed by the rain.

Classification

References

American Grand Prize, 1915
United States Grand Prix
American Grand Prize
Panama–Pacific International Exposition
Grand Prize
1910s in San Francisco